Perelman is an Ashkenazi Jewish surname. Notable people with the surname include:

 Bob Perelman (b. 1947), American poet
 Chaïm Perelman (1912–1984), Polish-born Belgian philosopher of law
 Eliezer Ben-Yehuda (born Eliezer Yitzhak Perlman) (1858-1922), Russian Jewish lexicographer of the Hebrew language and newspaper editor
 Grigori Perelman (b. 1966), Russian mathematician who proved the Poincaré conjecture
 Mikhail Perelman (1923–2002), Soviet gymnast, winner of Olympic gold medal
 Raymond G. Perelman (1917–2019), American businessman and philanthropist 
 Richard B. Perelman, author of Perelman's Pocket Cyclopedia of Cigars
 Ronald Perelman (b.1943), American banker, businessman, and investor
 S. J. Perelman (1904–1979), American humorist, author, and screenwriter
 Sean Kanan (b. 1966 as Sean Perelman), American actor
 Vadim Perelman (b. 1963), Ukrainian-born Canadian-American film director
 Yakov Perelman (1882–1942), Soviet science-writer and author of popular science-books

See also 
 Perl (disambiguation)
 Perle (disambiguation)
 Pearl (surname)
 Perlman
 Pearlman